Kater, besides meaning tomcat or hangover in Dutch and German, is the surname of the following people:

Fritz Kater, German trade unionist
Henry Kater, German-British physicist
Norman William Kater, Australian physician
Peter Kater, American pianist

See also
Tomcat (2016 film), a 2016 Austrian film
 Cater (disambiguation)
 Kata people, also known as Katir or Kator
 Katoor dynasty, also known as Kator or Katur